The Union of Forces of Progress (UFP) was a political party in Benin.

History
The party was established on 30 April 1990 as a successor to the People's Revolutionary Party of Benin. It was initially led by Machioudi Dissou. 

Although it did not contest the 1991 elections, it joined the Chameleon Alliance for the 1995 elections. The alliance received 1.5% of the vote, winning a single seat.

References

Defunct political parties in Benin
Political parties established in 1990